Katherine Leigh Copely, M.D. (born January 9, 1988) is a former American-born Ice Dancer who competed internationally for Lithuania. With partner Deividas Stagniūnas, she is the 4 time Lithuanian National Champion with Bronze Medals at both Golden Spin of Zagreb and Nebelhorn Trophy. Together they qualified for the 2010 Winter Olympics in Vancouver, Canada after placing in the top 20 at the 2009 World Figure Skating Championships in Los Angeles, California. She received her medical degree in 2018 from Central Michigan University College of Medicine.

Copely partnered with Duke Wensel in 2002. They competed until 2004 on the Novice and Junior levels. From 2004 to 2006, Copely skated at the Junior level with Patrick Connelly. She teamed up with Stagniunas in 2006 to compete for Lithuania. By the end of their partnership they were #10 in Europe and #14 in the World. Though they qualified, the team was subsequently prevented from competing at the 2010 Winter Olympics as Katherine was denied Lithuanian citizenship by then president Dalia Grybauskaitė  

Her brother is American Ice Dancer/Coach/Choreographer Dean Copely. Her mother is the respected skating costume designer Sandra Copely. Katherine is currently training in Diagnostic Radiology.

Programs
(with Stagniunas)

Results

With Duke Wensel

With Patrick Connelly

With Deividas Stagniūnas for Lithuania

References

External links

  Co-transplantation of Mesenchymal and Neural Stem Cells and Overexpressing Stromal-Derived Factor-1 for Treating Spinal Cord Injury   (Brain Res. 2017 Oct 1;1672:91-105) (contributing author)
 Copely K, Dawkins A. The floating gallbladder [published online ahead of print, 2020 Jan 28]. Abdom Radiol (NY). 2020;10.1007/s00261-020-02420-x. doi:10.1007/s00261-020-02420-x 
 
  Copely / Stagniunas archived official site
 Tracings.net profile
 Competition Photos on Getty Images

American female ice dancers
Lithuanian female ice dancers
People from Canton, Michigan
1988 births
Living people
Sportspeople from Cincinnati
21st-century American women